Fritillaria unibracteata is a species of flowering plant in the lily family Liliaceae, native to Gansu, Qinghai, Sichuan Provinces in China.

It is a bulb-forming perennial up to 40 cm tall. The flowers are pendent and nodding, bell-shaped, dark purple with yellowish-brown markings.

Varieties
 Fritillaria unibracteata var. longinectarea S.Y.Tang & S.C.Yueh - Sichuan
 Fritillaria unibracteata var. unibracteata - Gansu, Qinghai, Sichuan
 Fritillaria unibracteata var. wabuensis (S.Y.Tang & S.C.Yueh) Z.D.Liu, Shu Wang & S.C.Chen -  Sichuan

References

unibracteata
Endemic flora of China
Plants described in 1977